The Tōhoku Main Line is a  long railway line in Japan operated by the East Japan Railway Company (JR East). The line starts from Tokyo Station in Chiyoda, Tokyo and passes through such cities as Saitama, Utsunomiya, Fukushima, and Sendai, before reaching the end of the line in Morioka. The line originally extended to Aomori, but was truncated upon the extension of the Tōhoku Shinkansen beyond Morioka, which mostly parallels the Tōhoku Main Line. A portion of the Tōhoku Main Line is also shared with the Keihin–Tōhoku Line ( between Tokyo Station and Ōmiya Station in Ōmiya-ku, Saitama) and the Saikyō Line ( between Akabane Station in the Kita ward of Tokyo and Ōmiya Station).

Because of the difference in electrification south (1,500 V DC) and north (20 kV AC) of Kuroiso, there are no regularly scheduled passenger services that travel through that station.

Station list
These lists are separated by service patterns provided on the Tōhoku Main Line.

Tokyo – Kuroiso

Kuroiso – Shin-Shirakawa

Shin-Shirakawa – Fukushima

Fukushima – Sendai 

●: All rapid trains stop
|: All rapid trains pass

Sendai – Kogota

Kogota – Ichinoseki

Ichinoseki – Morioka 

A: Aterui
H: Hamayuri
●: All rapid trains stop
|: All rapid trains pass

Rolling stock

Tokyo – Kuroiso

 E231-1000 series EMUs
 E233-3000 series EMUs
 E131-600/-680 series EMUs
Previously
 205-600 series EMUs

From March 2013, a fleet of eight refurbished 4-car 205-600 series EMUs was phased in on Utsunomiya Line services between Koganei and Kuroiso, replacing 211 series sets.

Kuroiso – Shin-Shirakawa

 E531-3000 series EMUs

Shin-Shirakawa – Ichinoseki 

 701 series EMUs
 719 series EMUs
 E721 series/ SAT721 series EMUs
 HB-E210 series DMUs - Senseki-Tōhoku Line

Ichinoseki – Morioka
 701 series EMUs

History

The construction of the Tōhoku Main Line began in the Kantō region and extended to the north end of Honshu, and the city of Aomori. It is one of oldest railway lines in Japan, with construction beginning in the late 19th century. Until 1 November 1906, the current Tōhoku Main Line was run by a private company Nippon Railway.

In 1883, the first segment between Ueno and Kumagaya opened. In 1885, it was extended to Utsunomiya, but the Tone River had to be crossed by boat. Following construction of the Tone River Bridge in 1886, Utsunomiya and Ueno were directly connected. The line gradually extended further to the north; to Kōriyama, Sendai, Ichinoseki and Morioka. In 1891, the segment between Morioka and Aomori opened, creating the longest continuous railway line in Japan.

After 1906, the line was nationalized and became the Tōhoku Main Line operated by the Ministry of Railways. When Tokyo Station opened in 1925, the Tōhoku Main Line was extended from Ueno to the new station. Until the 1950s, this segment was used and many trains ran through both the Tōkaidō Main Line and Tōhoku Main Line. However, when the Tōhoku Shinkansen opened, it occupied land previously used for the tracks of mid and long-distance Tōhoku Main Line trains. As a result, only a small number of commuter lines such as the Keihin–Tōhoku Line now operate to Tokyo from the north, making Tokyo Station's status as part of the Tōhoku Main Line somewhat circumspect.

In 2002, the Tōhoku Shinkansen was extended from Morioka to Hachinohe and the operations of the local track segment between those two cities was turned over to Iwate Ginga Railway (IGR) and Aoimori Railway. With the extension of the Tōhoku Shinkansen to Shin-Aomori station in 2010, the segment between Hachinohe and Aomori was delegated to the Aoimori Railway Company.  The shortened Tōhoku Main Line is now the second-longest line in Japan, after the Sanin Main Line.

With the opening of the Ueno–Tokyo Line in March 2015, most longer distance trains once again operate directly through to the Tōkaidō Main Line via Tokyo Station, with the exception of some rush hour trains which terminate at Ueno Station.

Double-tracking
The Tokyo to Omiya section was double-tracked between 1892 and 1896, extended to Furukawa in 1908, Koyama the following year, and to Utsunomiya in 1913.

The Iwanuma - Sendai - Iwakiri section was double-tracked between 1920 & 1923 and the Utsunomiya - Iwanuma section between 1959 and 1964. The Iwakiri - Morioka - Aomori section was double-tracked between 1951 and 1968, including the  realigned section between Iwakiri and Atago in 1962.

Electrification
The  Tokyo to Tabata section was electrified at 1,500 V DC in 1909, extended to Akabane in 1928, Omiya in 1932 and Kuroiso in 1959. Electrification was then continued north at 20 kV AC, reaching Fukushima in 1960, Sendai in 1961, Morioka in 1965, and Aomori in 1968.

Former connecting lines

Saitama Prefecture
 Hasuda Station: The Bushu Railway operated a  line to Kamine from 1924 until 1938.

Tochigi Prefecture
 Mamada Station: A   gauge handcar line to Omoigawa operated between 1899 and 1917.
 Hoshakuji Station: A  line servicing the Utsunomiya Army Airfield operated between 1942 and 1945.
 Ujiie Station: An   gauge handcar line operated to Kitsuregawa between 1902 and 1918.
 Yaita Station: The Tobu Railway opened the   gauge Tobu Yaita Line to Shin Takatoku (on the Tobu Kinugawa Line) on 1 March 1924. The line was converted to  gauge in 1929, and closed on 30 June 1959.
 Nishi-Nasuno Station: A  line was opened by the Shiobara Railway to Shiobara in 1912. The line was electrified at 550 V DC in 1921, and closed in 1936. The Higashino Railway opened a  line to Nasu Ogawa between 1918 and 1924, the line closing in 1968. At Otawara Station, it connected with the  horse-drawn tramway mentioned below for the three years they were both open. A   gauge handcar line to Otawara opened in 1908. In 1917, it was converted to a horse-drawn tramway, but closed in 1921. At Otawara Station, it connected with the Higashino Railway line mentioned above.

Fukushima Prefecture
 Shirakawa Station: A  line to Iwaki Tanakura (on the Suigun Line) was opened by the Shirotana Railway in 1916. The line was nationalised in 1941, and closed in 1944. Plans to reopen the line in 1953 resulted in a decision to convert the line to a dedicated busway, which opened in 1957.
 Koriyama Station: The Fukushima Prefectural Government operated a   gauge line to Miharu between 1891 and 1914.
 Matsukawa Station: A  line to Iwashiro Kawamata operated from 1926 until 1972.

Miyagi Prefecture
 The Miyagi Prefectural Government operated the following three lines, all utilising  gauge track:
 Ogawara Station: a  line to Toogatta opened between 1917 and 1922, and closed in 1937.
 Tsukinoki Station: a  line to Tateyama, opened in 1899 as a horse-drawn tramway. Steam locomotion was introduced in 1917, and the line closed in 1929.
 Natori Station: a  line to Yurage, operated from 1926 until 1939.
 Nagamachi Station: A   gauge horse-drawn tramway was opened to Akiu Onsen in 1912. In 1925, the Akiho Electric Railway converted the line to  gauge and electrified it at 600 V DC. The line closed in 1961.
 Kofuku-Tagajo Station: When the Tōhoku Main Line was realigned in 1956, the original line to Shiogama Wharf (on the Senseki Line) remained in place as a freight-only line, closing in 1997.
 Matsushima-Machi Station: A   gauge handcar line operated between 1923 and 1930.
 Kogota Station: Prior to the opening of the Rikuu East Line, a   gauge horse-drawn tramway operated to Furukawa between 1900 and 1913.
 Semine Station: The Senpoku Railway operated a   gauge line from Tome to Tsukidate between 1921 and 1968.
 Ishikoshi Station: The Kurihara Den'en Railway Line operated between 1921 and 2007.

Iwate Prefecture
 Hanamaki Station: An   gauge line to Nishinamari Onsen was opened in 1915 by the Hanamaki Electric Railway, which then opened a second line, 8 km to Hanamaki Onsen in 1925. Both lines were electrified at 600 V DC. The latter closed in 1972, and the former in 1976.

Aomori Prefecture
 Hachinohe Station: The Gonohe Electric Railway operated a  line (not electrified, despite the company name) to Gonohe between 1929 and 1969.
 Misawa Station: The Towada Kanko Electric Railway Line operated between 1922 and 2012.
 Noheji Station: The Nanbu Jūkan Railway opened a  line to Shichinohe in 1962. Freight services ceased in 1984, and the line closed in 1997.

See also
 Utsunomiya Line
 Takasaki Line
 Shōnan–Shinjuku Line
 Ueno–Tokyo Line

References

 
Lines of East Japan Railway Company
Rail transport in Tochigi Prefecture
Rail transport in Fukushima Prefecture
Rail transport in Miyagi Prefecture
Rail transport in Iwate Prefecture
1067 mm gauge railways in Japan